John Wesley Methodist Episcopal Church is a historic church at 101 E. Court Street in Greenville, South Carolina, United States. The church was founded in 1866 by James R. Rosemond, who was a former slave. It was originally named Silver Hill United Methodist Episcopal Church, and was renamed after John Wesley in 1902.

The current building was built in 1899 and added to the National Register in 1978.

References

Methodist churches in South Carolina
Churches on the National Register of Historic Places in South Carolina
Gothic Revival church buildings in South Carolina
Churches completed in 1899
19th-century Methodist church buildings in the United States
Churches in Greenville County, South Carolina
National Register of Historic Places in Greenville, South Carolina
Methodist Episcopal churches in the United States